Heritage Park Historical Village is a historical park in Calgary, Alberta, Canada, on  of parkland on the banks of the Glenmore Reservoir, along the city's southwestern edge. The Historical Village is open from  late May to Thanksgiving and Heritage Town Square is open year-round. As Canada's second largest living history museum, it is one of the city's most visited tourist attractions. Exhibits span western Canadian history from the 1860s to the 1950s. Many of the buildings are historical and were transported to the park to be placed on display. Others are re-creations of actual buildings. Most of the structures are furnished and decorated with genuine artifacts. Staff dress in historic costume, and antique automobiles and horse-drawn vehicles service the site. Calgary Transit provides regular shuttle service from Heritage C-Train station. The park opened on July 1, 1964.

Park structure

The park is divided into four distinct areas reflecting different time periods in Western Canadian history: the Hudson's Bay Company Fur Trading Fort, c. 1864; the Pre-Railway Settlement Village, c. 1880; the Railway Prairie Town, c. 1910; and the newly opened (2009) Heritage Town Square, depicting the 1920s to 1950s.

Exhibits

Heritage Park Historical Village has over 100 exhibits including:
 A passenger train, drawn by one of the park's two working steam locomotives, that takes visitors around the park.
 A roundhouse built in 1981, which has an operational turntable and houses various railway equipment.
 A streetcar from Calgary's former streetcar system, Calgary Street Railway, that shuttles passengers to and from the parking lot. This was taken out of service in 2006 in preparation for the park's expansion, and returned to service in May 2010, taking passengers from the parking lot to the newly built CPR replica station and front gate.
 A re-creation of a paddle steamer, S.S. Moyie, that traverses the Glenmore Reservoir
 An antique midway that features working historical amusement park rides
 An aboriginal encampment representing the First Peoples in southern Alberta in the 19th century
 A working smithy, bakery, hotel, and several shops and restaurants
 Horse-drawn wagons
 A Hudson's Bay Company trading fort
 The 1913 Little Synagogue on the Prairie
 The Town Square, located in front of the park gates, contains Haskayne Mercantile Block, Selkirk Grille and Big Rock Interpretive Brewery flanked by the Bissett Wetlands. It was opened in 2009 and admission is free in this area of the park.

Expansion
In March 2009, Heritage Park opened a major new expansion, the Heritage Town Square. The addition features several new buildings depicting a larger 1930s and 1940s western Canadian town. Heritage Town Square is open year-round, unlike the rest of the park, which is seasonal.

Some of the new attractions include:
 The Famous 5 Center of Canadian Women - A replica of Nellie McClung's Calgary home which tells the story of influential women in Canadian history.
 a new year-round Gasoline Alley Museum showcasing the park's extensive antique car and memorabilia collection 
 an orientation/visitor's centre (within a replica railway station)
 a 1930s town square (which includes shops, and food services)
 a re-creation of a CPR railway station restaurant

See also

Fort Edmonton Park
List of heritage railways in Canada
List of museums in Canada

References

External links

 Heritage Park Historical Village

1964 establishments in Alberta
Automobile museums in Alberta
Grain elevator museums in Alberta
Heritage railways in Alberta
Living museums in Canada
Museums in Calgary
Open-air museums in Canada
Parks in Calgary
Railway roundhouses in Alberta
Railway station museums in Alberta